Crisp County is a county located in the central portion of the U.S. state of Georgia. As of the 2020 census, the population was 20,128. The county seat is Cordele. The county was created on August 17, 1905, from Dooly County and named for Georgia Congressman Charles Frederick Crisp.

Crisp County comprises the Cordele, GA Micropolitan Statistical Area.

Geography

The western two-thirds of Crisp County, bordered on the east by a line from south of Arabi running northeast, is located in the Middle Flint River sub-basin of the ACF River Basin (Apalachicola-Chattahoochee-Flint River Basin). The eastern third of the county is located in the Alapaha River sub-basin of the Suwannee River.

Major highways

  Interstate 75
  U.S. Route 41
  U.S. Route 280
  State Route 7
  State Route 30
  State Route 33
  State Route 33 Connector
  State Route 90
  State Route 257
  State Route 300
  State Route 300 Connector
  State Route 401 (unsigned designation for I-75)

Adjacent counties
 Dooly County (north)
 Wilcox County (east)
 Turner County (southeast)
 Worth County (southwest)
 Lee County (west)
 Sumter County (west)

Demographics

2000 census
As of the census of 2000, there were 21,996 people, 8,337 households, and 5,869 families living in the county.  The population density was 80 people per square mile (31/km2).  There were 9,559 housing units at an average density of 35 per square mile (13/km2).  The racial makeup of the county was 54.07% White, 43.40% Black or African American, 0.15% Native American, 0.68% Asian, 0.03% Pacific Islander, 0.98% from other races, and 0.68% from two or more races.  1.74% of the population were Hispanic or Latino of any race.

There were 8,337 households, out of which 34.80% had children under the age of 18 living with them, 44.80% were married couples living together, 21.60% had a female householder with no husband present, and 29.60% were non-families. 26.10% of all households were made up of individuals, and 11.10% had someone living alone who was 65 years of age or older.  The average household size was 2.58 and the average family size was 3.10.

In the county, the population was spread out, with 29.00% under the age of 18, 9.20% from 18 to 24, 27.00% from 25 to 44, 21.80% from 45 to 64, and 13.00% who were 65 years of age or older.  The median age was 34 years. For every 100 females there were 88.70 males.  For every 100 females age 18 and over, there were 84.00 males.

The median income for a household in the county was $26,547, and the median income for a family was $32,747. Males had a median income of $28,595 versus $19,393 for females. The per capita income for the county was $14,695.  About 24.60% of families and 29.30% of the population were below the poverty line, including 41.80% of those under age 18 and 24.00% of those age 65 or over.

2010 census
As of the 2010 United States Census, there were 23,439 people, 9,079 households, and 6,295 families living in the county. The racial makeup of the county was 53.3% white, 43.0% black or African American, 0.8% Asian, 0.1% American Indian, 1.8% from other races, and 1.0% from two or more races. Those of Hispanic or Latino origin made up 3.2% of the population. In terms of ancestry, 9.7% were Irish, 9.3% were American, and 7.8% were English.

Of the 9,079 households, 34.4% had children under the age of 18 living with them, 42.7% were married couples living together, 21.3% had a female householder with no husband present, 30.7% were non-families, and 26.8% of all households were made up of individuals. The average household size was 2.53 and the average family size was 3.04. The median age was 38.1 years.

The median income for a household in the county was $29,960 and the median income for a family was $41,616. Males had a median income of $35,290 versus $25,932 for females. The per capita income for the county was $17,187. About 24.0% of families and 29.1% of the population were below the poverty line, including 47.9% of those under age 18 and 16.9% of those age 65 or over.

2020 census

As of the 2020 United States census, there were 20,128 people, 8,585 households, and 5,712 families residing in the county.

Education

Communities
 Arabi
 Coney
 Cordele (county seat)

Politics

See also

 National Register of Historic Places listings in Crisp County, Georgia
List of counties in Georgia

References

External links
 http://www.crispcounty.com
 Crisp County historical marker

 
1905 establishments in Georgia (U.S. state)
Georgia (U.S. state) counties
Populated places established in 1905
Majority-minority counties in Georgia